The Coupe d'Haïti is the premier elimination tournament of the Ligue Haïtienne.

Finals
Finals so far:

Coupe Borno
1927 : Violette AC
1928 : Violette AC
1929 : Violette AC
1930 : Violette AC

Coupe Vincent
1932 : Union des Sociétés Artibonitiennes (Gonaïves)
1937 : Etoile Haïtienne (Port-au-Prince)
1937/38 : AS Capoise (Cap-Haïtien)
1939 : Violette AC (Port-au-Prince)
1941 : Racing CH (Port-au-Prince)
1942 : Excelsior AC (Port-au-Prince)
1944 : Racing CH (Port-au-Prince)
1945 : Racing CH (Port-au-Prince)
1947 : Hatüey Bacardi Club (Port-au-Prince)
1949 : Hatüey Bacardi Club (Port-au-Prince)
1950 : Excelsior AC (Port-au-Prince)
1951/52 : Violette AC (Port-au-Prince)

Coupe la Couronne
•1954 : Violette AC (Port-au-Prince)

Coupe Vincent (cont.)
1954 : Victory SC (Port-au-Prince)
1960 : Aigle Noir AC (Port-au-Prince)
1962 : Victory SC (Port-au-Prince)

Coupe F. Duvalier
1968 : Violette AC (Port-au-Prince)

Coupe Vincent (cont.)
1970 : Victory SC (Port-au-Prince)
1971 : Victory SC (Port-au-Prince)

Coupe Solange Figaro
1976 : Tempête FC              1-0 Baltimore SC

Coupe Caterpillar
1978 : Violette AC

Fraternité Léogâne
1988 : Tempête FC                                                    2-1 AS Carrefour
1989 : Tempête FC                                                    1-0 Racing de Gonaïves

Super Coupe d'Haïti
1992 : Don Bosco FC Tempête FC [presumably played late 1993]
2005 : Tempête FC                                                    2-1 AS Mirebalais                                                    1-0 AS Saint-Louis

Super Huit (Coupe Digicel)
2006 : Baltimore SC    1-1 Racing CH (5-4 pen)
2007 : Tempête FC      3-0 Zénith FC
2008 : AS Mirebalais   1-1 Baltimore SC    (4-3 pen) [Final Feb 21, 2009]
2009 : AS Capoise      1-1 Baltimore SC    (Baltimore SC dns for pen)

Super Huit (Coupe Digicel) (cont.)
2010 : Victory SC  
2010/11 : Aigle Noir AC   2-0 AS Mirebalais
2011 : AS Capoise       0-0 Tempête FC      (5-4 pen)
2012 : Tempête FC       2-0 FICA
2013 : Baltimore SC     0-0 Racing Club Haïtien  (5-4 pen)
2014 : America FC         2-1 AS Mirebalais

References

National association football cups
Cup